The Cayman Brac blind snake (Cubatyphlops epactius) is a species of snake in the family Typhlopidae.

Geographic range
C. epactius is endemic to the Cayman Islands.

Habitat

Reproduction
C. epactius is oviparous.

References

Further reading
Hedges SB, Marion AB, Lipp KM, Marin J, Vidal N (2014). "A taxonomic framework for typhlopid snakes from the Caribbean and other regions (Reptilia, Squamata)". Caribbean Herpetology 49: 1-61. (Cubatyphlops epactius, new combination, p. 46).
Schwartz A, Henderson RW (1999). Amphibians and Reptiles of the West Indies: Descriptions, Distributions, and Natural History. Gainesville, Florida: University of Florida Press. 720 pp. . (Typhlops epactia, new status, p. 647).
Schwartz A, Thomas R (1975). A Check-list of West Indian Amphibians and Reptiles. Carnegie Museum of Natural History Special Publication No. 1. Pittsburgh, Pennsylvania: Carnegie Museum of Natural History. 216 pp. (Typhlops biminiensis epactia, p. 196).
Thomas R (1968). "The Typhlops biminiensis Group of Antillean Blind Snakes". Copeia 1968 (4): 713–722. (Typhlops biminiensis epactia, new subspecies, p. 715).

Cubatyphlops
Reptiles described in 1968